Time in Maldives is given by Maldives Time (MVT) (UTC+05:00). However, some island resorts operate their own time zone, known as Maldives Island Time, up to 2 hours ahead of the official Maldives Time. The Maldives does not currently observe daylight saving time as time does not vary in Maldives due to be located in the equator.

References

Maldives